Mary Island may refer to:

Mary Island (Nunavut) in the Canadian Arctic 
Kanton Island, Kiribati 
Mary Island (Western Australia)